Pixley is an unincorporated community in Barber County, Kansas, United States.

History
Pixley had a post office from 1892 until 1897.

See also
 Fictional Hooterville and Pixley

References

Further reading

External links
 Barber County maps: Current, Historic, KDOT

Unincorporated communities in Barber County, Kansas
Unincorporated communities in Kansas